Nationality words link to articles with information on the nation's poetry or literature (for instance, Irish or France).

Events

Works published
 Anonymous, King Alexander, publication year uncertain, written in the early 14th century; freely adapted from Thomas of Kent's Roman de toute chevalerie of the 12th century
 Pietro Bembo, Prose nelle quali si ragiona della volgar lingua (Prose della volgar lingua), the author's most influential work, a prose treatise on writing poetry in Italian; discussing verse composition in detail, including rhyme, stress, the sounds of words, balance and variety; criticism, Italy
 William Walter, Titus and Gesippus, publication year uncertain, translated from a Latin version of Boccaccio's Decameron, Day 10, Tale 8
 John Walton, The Consolation of Philosophy, translated from Boethius' The Consolation of Philosophy (see also Geoffrey Chaucer's translation of the same work, 1478 edition)
 Petrarch, edited by Allesandro Vellutello, Il Petrarco; the editor reordered the sequence of the "scattered" poems to reflect a narrative of Petrarch's life; the text would be reprinted 29 times in the 16th century; posthumous

Births
Death years link to the corresponding "[year] in poetry" article:
 March 25 – Richard Edwardes, also spelled "Richard Edwards" (died 1566), English poet and playwright; a Gentleman of the Chapel Royal and master of the singing boys
 Pir Roshan (died 1582/1585), Pashtun warrior poet and intellectual also writing in Persian and Arabic
 Jan van Casembroot (died 1568), South Holland noble and poet
 Approximate date – Hans Wilhelm Kirchhof (died 1602), German Landsknecht, baroque poet and translator

Deaths
Birth years link to the corresponding "[year] in poetry" article:
 May 27 – Thomas Müntzer (born c. 1489), German theologian and poet, executed
 Jean Lemaire de Belges died about this year (born c. 1473), Walloon poet and historian who lived primarily in France
 Cornelio Vitelli (born 1450), Italian, Latin-language poet

See also

 Poetry
 16th century in poetry
 16th century in literature
 French Renaissance literature
 Renaissance literature
 Spanish Renaissance literature

Notes

16th-century poetry
Poetry